Van Hee is a surname. Notable people with the surname include:

 Kees van Hee (born 1946), Dutch computer scientist
 Kim Van Hee (born 1978), Belgian singer

See also
 Van Hees

Dutch-language surnames
Surnames of Dutch origin